Blegoš, with an elevation of , is the second-highest peak in the Škofja Loka Hills of Upper Carniola (northwestern Slovenia), after Mount Altemaver on the Ratitovec Ridge. From the summit it is possible to see the highest Slovenian mountain groups in the Julian Alps, the Karawanks, and the Kamnik–Savinja Alps.

Name

Blegoš was attested in historical records as Bligosh and Bligos in 1763–1787. In the local dialect, it is known as Bliegaš. The name Blegoš is a clipped borrowing from the German name Fleherskofel (a compound of Fleher 'suppliant, petitioner' and Kofel 'mountain with a rounded top').

See also
 Dolenja Žetina
 Jelovica, Gorenja Vas–Poljane

References

External links

Blegoš on Hribi.net
Blegoš (from Črni Kal) on Slovenia-trips.net

One-thousanders of Slovenia
Mountains of the Alps